LCDD may refer to: 

 Light chain deposition disease
 La Chanson du Dimanche, a musical group
 Linear Collider Detector Description, software for a linear collider